Nikola Tanasković (born 21 October 1997) is a Serbian professional basketball player for Igokea of the Championship of Bosnia and Herzegovina and the ABA League.

Professional career
In December 2015, 18-year-old Tanasković signed his first professional contract with Partizan Belgrade. On 17 February 2017, Tanasković made his debut for Partizan in Radivoj Korać Cup against Dunav, he recorded 10 points and 11 rebounds.

On June 10, 2019, Tanasković signed for Mega Bemax.

In September 2020, he signed for the Bosnian team Borac Banja Luka.

In June 2021, Tanasković he signed a two-year contract with Igokea.

Career achievements and awards 
 Serbian Cup winner: 1 (with Partizan NIS: 2017–18)
 Bosnian Cup winner: 1 (with Igokea: 2021–22)

Personal life 
His younger brother Dušan is a basketball player.

References

External links
 Nikola Tanasković at eurobasket.com

1997 births
Living people
ABA League players
Basketball League of Serbia players
KK Igokea players
KK Mladost Zemun players
KK Partizan players
KK Spartak Subotica players
OKK Beograd players
OKK Borac players
People from Smederevska Palanka
Serbian expatriate basketball people in Bosnia and Herzegovina
Serbian men's basketball players
Small forwards